Çalışlar is a village in the İscehisar District, Afyonkarahisar Province, Turkey. Its population is 1,766 (2021).

References

Villages in İscehisar District